Submarine is a 2010 coming-of-age comedy-drama film written and directed by Richard Ayoade and starring Craig Roberts, Yasmin Paige, Noah Taylor, Paddy Considine and Sally Hawkins. It was adapted from the 2008 novel Submarine by Joe Dunthorne, and is an international co-production between the United Kingdom and the United States. Submarine is Ayoade's directorial debut.

Plot
Oliver Tate is an unpopular Welsh 15-year-old who is infatuated with classmate Jordana. After Oliver teases another girl to get Jordana's attention, she invites him to meet secretly after school and takes pictures of them kissing. Jordana uses the pictures to make her ex-boyfriend Mark jealous; Mark roughs up Oliver, but Oliver refuses to say that Jordana is a slut. Jordana becomes Oliver's girlfriend and, after a couple of weeks, they have sex in the Tate parents' bedroom while the parents are out.

At home, Oliver becomes concerned about his parents. His father, Lloyd, is depressed. New-age guru Graham, an ex-boyfriend of his mother, Jill, has moved in next door, and his flirtations rouse Oliver's suspicions.

Oliver's relationship with Jordana grows, but he learns that her mother has a potentially fatal brain tumour. At an early Christmas dinner at Jordana's house, he witnesses her father break down. Unsettled, he decides that the Jordana he loves is at risk because the emotional events surrounding her will "make her gooey in the middle." Rather than visit Jordana's mother in hospital, as he has promised to, he loses his nerve and cuts off contact.

Thinking that his mother and Graham are having an affair, Oliver attempts to repair his parents' relationship. While searching for his mother on the beach, he is stunned to see Jordana with another boy. Walking home, dejected, he sees his mother with Graham and assumes the worst. Enraged, he breaks into Graham's house, gets drunk, and commits minor acts of vandalism. When Graham comes home, he finds Oliver but returns him home with minimal fuss. The next morning, Oliver awakes to see that both his parents aren't angry with him and are reconciling.

Oliver remains distraught about losing Jordana; he is downhearted for weeks, until he sees her on the beach. He runs to her and apologizes, learning that Jordana does not actually have a new boyfriend. Together, they walk several inches deep into the sea, smiling.

Cast
Craig Roberts as Oliver Tate
Yasmin Paige as Jordana Bevan
Sally Hawkins as Jill Tate
Noah Taylor as Lloyd Tate
Paddy Considine as Graham Purvis
Gemma Chan as Kim-Lin
Melanie Walters as Jude Bevan
Steffan Rhodri as Mr. Davey
Ben Stiller as Soap Opera Star (uncredited)

Production

Casting
Michael Sheen and X Factor contestant Lucie Jones were originally cast in the film but dropped out due to other commitments.

Filming
The film was produced by Warp Films and Film4 Productions. Principal photography began on 26 October 2009 and filming finished in December 2009.  Filming locations in Wales included Swansea, Cardiff, Rhondda, and Barry.

Soundtrack

Six original songs were written and performed by Alex Turner, the frontman of Arctic Monkeys. The soundtrack charted at 35 in the UK Album Chart.

The original score was composed by Andrew Hewitt, long-time collaborator of Ayoade, recorded at Air Studios with The Composers Ensemble orchestra.

Release
The film premiered at the 35th Toronto International Film Festival in September 2010. Following a generally positive reception it was picked up by The Weinstein Company for a North American release. The film also played at the 54th London Film Festival in October 2010 and was played out of competition at the 27th Sundance Film Festival in January 2011. It was also screened along with 400 other films at the 61st Berlin International Film Festival the next month.

Critical reception
Submarine received positive reviews from critics. The website's critics consensus: "Funny, stylish, and ringing with adolescent truth, Submarine marks Richard Ayoade as a talent to watch." At Metacritic, which assigns a weighted average score out of 100 to reviews from mainstream critics, the film received an average score of 76 based on 37 reviews, indicating "generally favorable reviews".

Critic Roger Ebert gave the film 3/4 stars saying "Submarine isn't an insipid teen sex comedy. It flaunts some stylistic devices, such as titles and sections and self-aware narration, but it doesn't try too hard to be desperately clever. It's a self-confident work for the first-time director, Richard Ayoade, whose purpose I think is to capture that delicate moment in some adolescent lives when idealism and trust lead to tentative experiments. Because Craig Roberts and Yasmin Paige are enormously likable in their roles, they win our sympathy and make us realize that too many movies about younger teenagers are filtered through the sensibility of more weathered minds."

References

External links

2010 films
2010 romantic comedy-drama films
2010 directorial debut films
2010s English-language films
2010s British films
2010s coming-of-age comedy-drama films
2010s teen comedy-drama films
2010s teen romance films
British coming-of-age comedy-drama films
British romantic comedy-drama films
British teen comedy-drama films
British teen romance films
Coming-of-age romance films
English-language Welsh films
Films about depression
Films about school bullying
Films about school violence
Films about infidelity
Films about marriage
Films about virginity
Films directed by Richard Ayoade
Films scored by Andrew Hewitt
Films set in 1997
Films set in schools
Films set in Swansea
Films shot in Swansea
Films shot in Wales
Film4 Productions films
Red Hour Productions films